Noorlander or de Noorlander is a Dutch toponymic surname. Notable people with the surname include:

Ed de Noorlander (born 1945), Dutch decathlete
Seda Noorlander (born 1974), Dutch tennis player

References

Dutch-language surnames
Toponymic surnames